The 2011 USAC Traxxas Silver Crown Champ Car Series season was the 40th season of the USAC Silver Crown Series. The series began with the Sumar Classic at the Terre Haute Action Track on April 23, and ended on October 15 at the Rollie Beale Classic at Toledo Speedway. Levi Jones began the season as the defending champion and retained his title over Jerry Coons Jr. by a three point margin. It was his seventh USAC title (along with five USAC National Sprint Car titles) which tied him with Rich Vogler, A. J. Foyt, and Mel Kenyon for the most USAC open wheel titles. Jones' co-owner Tony Stewart recorded his sixth Silver Crown title and co-owner Curb Agajanian Performance Group recorded its second. Kyle Larson was the series' Rookie of the Year.

Results

References: schedule

Final Drivers Points Standings (Top 10)

Reference:

References

USAC Traxxas Silver Crown Series
United States Auto Club